Reginald Howard White (December 19, 1961 – December 26, 2004) was an American professional football player who played defensive end in the National Football League (NFL) for 15 seasons during the 1980s and 1990s. He played college football for the University of Tennessee, and was recognized as an All-American. After playing two professional seasons for the Memphis Showboats of the United States Football League (USFL), he was selected in the first round of the 1984 Supplemental Draft, and then played for the NFL's Philadelphia Eagles, Green Bay Packers, and Carolina Panthers, becoming one of the most awarded defensive players in NFL history.

The two-time NFL Defensive Player of the Year, Super Bowl XXXI champion, 13-time Pro Bowl, and 13-time All-Pro selection holds second place all-time among NFL career sack leaders with 198 (behind Bruce Smith's 200 career sacks). He was selected to the NFL 75th Anniversary All-Time Team, NFL 100th Anniversary All-Time Team, NFL 1990s All-Decade Team, and the NFL 1980s All-Decade Team. During his professional career, he was also known for his Christian ministry as an ordained evangelical minister, leading to his nickname, "the Minister of Defense". White is a member of the College Football Hall of Fame and the Pro Football Hall of Fame.

Early years
White was born in Chattanooga, Tennessee. He played high school football at Howard High School under Coach Robert Pulliam, a former defensive lineman at Tennessee. During his senior year with the Hustlin' Tigers, White recorded 140 tackles (88 solo) and 10 sacks, and received All-American honors. He was rated the number one recruit in Tennessee by the Knoxville News Sentinel.

Reggie's mother, Thelma Collier, told Sports Illustrated that when he was 12 years old he announced that he wanted to be two things: a football player and a minister.

College career

White played college football at Tennessee from 1980 to 1983. He had worked his way into the starting lineup by the end of his freshman year, in which he registered 51 tackles (32 solo) and two sacks, recovered two fumbles, and blocked a punt that set up Tennessee's first score in the team's 23–10 win over then-rival Georgia Tech. He was awarded the "Andy Spiva Award", given annually to the Vols' most improved defensive player.

As a sophomore during the 1981 season, White registered 95 tackles (61 solo), a team-leading eight sacks, and a team-leading seven tackles-for-loss. He also blocked three extra-point attempts. He had 10 tackles and two sacks, one of which resulted in a safety, against Memphis State, and was named the team's "outstanding defensive player" for the game. For his performance in Tennessee's 10–7 win over Georgia Tech, which included a late fumble recovery that sealed the Vols' victory, he was named "Southeast Lineman of the Week" by UPI. White had eight tackles in Tennessee's 28–21 victory over Wisconsin in the 1981 Garden State Bowl, and was named the game's "Best Defensive Player". At the end of the season, he was named to the Sophomore All-American team by The Football News.

White was named a Preseason All-American going into the 1982 season, but was consistently bothered by an ankle injury, and his production dropped off. While he registered just 47 tackles (36 solo), he nevertheless led the team with seven sacks, and was third only to teammates Mike Cofer and Carlton Peoples in "big plays". His best game of the season came in the Vols' 24–24 tie against LSU, in which he registered eight tackles, including a sack and a fourth-down stop. He had eight tackles, two sacks, and a forced fumble in Tennessee's 28–22 loss to Iowa in the 1982 Peach Bowl.

Determined to improve upon what he considered a disappointing junior campaign, White erupted during his senior season in 1983, registering 100 tackles (72 solo), a school single-season record 15 sacks, 9 tackles-for-loss, and an interception.  Although Pittsburgh defeated Tennessee 13–3 in the season opener, White consistently kept the Panthers' offense off balance, in spite of being lined up against the Panthers' All-American offensive lineman Bill Fralic. He had two sacks in Tennessee's 31–6 win over New Mexico, and a school single-game record four sacks in the Vols' blowout win over The Citadel. White was named "Southeast Lineman of the Week" for his performance – which included 12 tackles and three sacks – in Tennessee's 20–6 win over LSU, and he twice sacked Alabama quarterback Walter Lewis in Tennessee's 41–34 win over the Tide. In Tennessee's 30–23 win over Maryland in the 1983 Florida Citrus Bowl, White sacked heralded Maryland quarterback Boomer Esiason in the second quarter, knocking him out of the game. White was a consensus All-American, SEC Player of the Year, and a Lombardi Award finalist.

During his tenure at the University of Tennessee, White registered 293 tackles (201 solo), 32 sacks, 19 tackles-for-loss, four fumble recoveries, and seven batted-down passes. His 15 sacks in a season (in 1983) remain a school record. His mark of 32 career sacks remained a school record until it was broken by Derek Barnett during the 2016 season. His school single-game record of four sacks (against The Citadel in 1983) stood until 2013, when Corey Miller had four and a half sacks against Kentucky.

Professional football career

USFL

Memphis Showboats
After his college football career, White was chosen by the Memphis Showboats in the 1984 USFL Territorial Draft, and the opportunity to play pro ball in the same state where he went to college was enough enticement for him to sign. He played for Memphis for two seasons, starting in 36 games. As a member of the Showboats, he racked up 23.5 sacks, one safety and one forced fumble recovered for a touchdown.

NFL

Philadelphia Eagles
When the USFL collapsed in 1985, White took a salary cut in Philadelphia. The Eagles signed him to a four-year, $1.85 million deal after buying out the remaining three years on his Memphis contract. At the time White was still an unproven entity, but his anonymity did not last long. He joined the Eagles after the 1985 season had begun, missing the first few games. When he finally did start, he made ten tackles and two-and-a-half sacks in his first game. By season's end he had turned in 13 sacks in as many games, and he was named NFC defensive rookie of the year.

He played with the Eagles for eight seasons, He played in 121 games and picked up 124 sacks, becoming the Eagles' all-time sack leader. He also set the Eagles' regular-season record with 21 sacks in a single season (1987, a season shortened to 12 games). The lowest number of sacks he ever recorded in Philadelphia was 11 in 1989. White also became the only player ever to accumulate 20 or more sacks in just 12 games. He set an NFL regular-season record during 1987 by averaging the most sacks per game, with 1.75. Over the course of his tenure with the Eagles, White actually accumulated more sacks than the number of games he played. He was voted by ESPN Sportsnation as the greatest player in Eagles' franchise history. In 1991, he set the record for most passes defended in a single season by a defensive lineman with 13, a mark that has been since broken by J. J. Watt.

Green Bay Packers

In 1993, White became a free agent. He was signed by the Green Bay Packers and agreed to terms on a four-year contract worth $17 million. He played for the Packers for six seasons. White notched up another 68.5 sacks to become, at the time, the Packers' all-time leader in that category (third now to Clay Matthews III and Kabeer Gbaja-Biamila). White was also just as valued for his role as a team leader. He helped the Packers win a Super Bowl, with a game-ending sack, in Super Bowl XXXI. During the game, White had 3 sacks to set the single game record for a Super Bowl. That victory was his only championship at any level. In 1998, White was named the NFL Defensive Player of the Year for the second time.

Carolina Panthers
In 2000, he came out of a one-year retirement and started all 16 games for the Carolina Panthers. White had five and a half sacks and one forced fumble while with the team. He again retired at the end of the 2000 season.

NFL career statistics

Retirement

At the time of his retirement, White was the NFL's all-time sacks leader with 198. (He has since been surpassed by Bruce Smith, who accumulated 200 in 47 more games played.) Counting his time in the USFL, White has 221.5 sacks in professional football, making him professional football's all-time sacks leader. White also recorded three interceptions, which he returned for 79 yards. He recovered 19 fumbles, which he returned for 137 yards and three touchdowns. His nine consecutive seasons (1985–1993) with at least 10 sacks remain an NFL record. He was named an All-Pro for 13 of his 15 seasons, including eight as a first-team selection. Reggie White is considered by many to be one of the best defensive players in NFL history.

Professional wrestling
White appeared on screen at two professional wrestling events, wrestling one match. In April 1995, he was ringside as part of Lawrence Taylor's "All-Stars" for his match against Bam Bam Bigelow at WrestleMania XI. During the show, he participated in one backstage segment with the All-Stars, calling out The Million Dollar Corporation member King Kong Bundy. Before and during the actual match, the All-Stars and the Million Dollar Corporation were involved in a scuffle, in which White participated.

On May 18, 1997, White wrestled his only professional wrestling match for WCW at Slamboree. He wrestled fellow NFL (and LT's All-Star teammate) alumnus Steve McMichael. The two men emulated football tackles during their bout. White received a warm response from the professional wrestling crowd in Charlotte, North Carolina, but nonetheless lost to McMichael after being hit with a steel Zero Halliburton briefcase secretly given to McMichael by his Four Horsemen teammate, Jeff Jarrett.

Christian ministry
White became involved with the Fellowship of Christian Athletes while at the University of Tennessee, and expressed an interest in becoming an evangelist as early as his sophomore year in 1981. He became an ordained Baptist minister during this period. He had acquired the nickname "Minister of Defense" by the time he was a senior.

In White's last year of football, a friend reportedly gave White a teaching CD from Messianic teacher Monte Judah. Following his retirement, White began studying Torah and Torah-observant Messianic theology. White also studied Hebrew under Nehemia Gordon. In October 2003, White was interviewed by Messianic teacher and televangelist Michael Rood, and he discussed his studies of Torah. The interview was broadcast on February 4 and 6, 2005, on the Sky Angel cable channel. White went on to co-produce Rood's half-hour "A Rood Awakening From Israel" TV programs. Following White's death, the January 2005 edition of Messianic magazine Yavoh was dedicated to him as a "Messianic believer", leading to confusion regarding White's religious beliefs. Some reported – incorrectly – that White had abandoned Christianity and was studying Judaism.

White was touched by the African American church arson scares during the mid-1990s. The Inner City Church in Knoxville, Tennessee, where White was an associate minister, burned to the ground in 1996. That same year, he starred with Pat Morita in Reggie's Prayer, a Christian film. He played protagonist Reggie Knox, a football player who retires after the 1996 season to become a 10th-grade history teacher and head coach of a high school football team in Portland, Oregon. The film also had appearances by his Packers teammates Brett Favre and Mike Holmgren as janitors, and Keith Jackson as an assistant coach. M.C. Hammer plays a park ranger.

In an interview with ABC's 20/20, White made comments about gays and lesbians. White became an ally of organizations opposed to homosexuality; he appeared in a newspaper advertising campaign to convince gays and lesbians that they could "cease" their homosexuality. As a result, CBS withdrew a five-year, $6-million contract for being a part of The NFL Today because of his statements calling homosexuality a sin. Both the Green Bay Packers and the NFL objected to the ads, since White had appeared in his football uniform without the consent of the team or the league. Later versions of the ad removed the uniform.

Death and legacy

On the morning of December 26, 2004, White was rushed from his home in Cornelius, North Carolina, to a nearby hospital in Huntersville, North Carolina, where he was pronounced dead. White had succumbed to cardiac arrhythmia. According to the Mecklenburg County Medical Examiner's Office, the most likely cause was the cardiac and pulmonary sarcoidosis White had lived with for years. It was also stated that sleep apnea, from which White was known to suffer, may have contributed to his death. His grave site is located at Glenwood Memorial Park, Mooresville, North Carolina.

White's widow, Sara, in conjunction with the Sleep Wellness Institute, founded the Reggie White Sleep Disorders Research and Education Foundation, dedicated to all people having access to treatment for sleep disorders, regardless of their socio-economic status.

Accolades

Jersey number retirements

During the 2005 season, the Philadelphia Eagles, the Green Bay Packers, and the University of Tennessee retired White's number 92 jersey.

The University of Tennessee retired White's jersey at a halftime presentation on October 1, 2005, during their game against Ole Miss, the third such retirement in the modern era of football at the school; a commemorative sign was also unveiled in the south end of Neyland Stadium. During a halftime presentation at Lambeau Field on September 18, 2005, White became the fifth Green Bay Packer to have his number retired by the franchise. On December 5, 2005, the Philadelphia Eagles retired his jersey in a halftime ceremony during the Eagles' Monday Night Football game with the Seattle Seahawks, which were coached by Mike Holmgren, White's former coach in Green Bay. White became the first (and so far only) player in NFL history to have his number officially retired by multiple teams. The Packers and the Eagles also wore a helmet decal honoring White for the remaining games in the season.

Hall of Fame
White was posthumously elected to the Professional Football Hall of Fame on his first ballot on February 4, 2006. He was enshrined at a ceremony on August 5, 2006, in Canton, Ohio. White's widow, Sara White, delivered her husband's acceptance speech at the ceremony. She was introduced by their son, Jeremy White, who also released the first copies of his autobiography, In His Shadow: Growing Up With Reggie White, during the Hall of Fame weekend in honor of his father. Jeremy thanked the "God of Abraham, Isaac, and Jacob" in his introduction, echoing Reggie White's dedication to his faith.

White was elected to the Wisconsin Athletic Hall of Fame in 2005, and the Philadelphia Sports Hall of Fame in 2007.

Named streets
The official sign hanging for Reggie White Boulevard took place on Monday, December 8, 2008, at 2 p.m. at the intersection of 20th and Carter Street in Chattanooga, Tennessee. White's mother, Thelma White Collier, along with other family and friends, were on hand to witness the change to Reggie White Boulevard. The official name change was approved by the Chattanooga City Council on November 4, 2008.

Reggie White Way in Green Bay, Wisconsin, is off Lombardi Avenue near Lambeau Field.

See also

 Crescent Rising
 List of athletes who came out of retirement

References

External links

 
 

1961 births
2004 deaths
100 Sacks Club
20th-century Baptist ministers from the United States
African-American Baptist ministers
African-American players of American football
All-American college football players
American football defensive ends
American football defensive tackles
Baptists from North Carolina
Baptists from Tennessee
Burials in North Carolina
Carolina Panthers players
College Football Hall of Fame inductees
Green Bay Packers players
Leaders of the Fellowship of Christian Athletes
Memphis Showboats players
National Conference Pro Bowl players
National Football League Defensive Player of the Year Award winners
National Football League players with retired numbers
People from Cornelius, North Carolina
Philadelphia Eagles players
Players of American football from Knoxville, Tennessee
Players of American football from North Carolina
Pro Football Hall of Fame inductees
Sportspeople from Chattanooga, Tennessee
Tennessee Volunteers football players
Ed Block Courage Award recipients
Deaths from sarcoidosis